The Select Group is a panel of English professional football referees and assistant referees, appointed by Professional Game Match Officials Limited (PGMOL).

Select Group 1
In August 2022, the PGMOL announced the referees and assistant referees for the forthcoming season.

Referees

 Stuart Attwell
 Peter Bankes
 Tom Bramall
 John Brooks
 David Coote
 Darren England
 Jarred Gillett
 Tony Harrington
 Simon Hooper
 Rob Jones 
 Chris Kavanagh
 Andy Madley
 Andre Marriner
 Michael Oliver
 Craig Pawson
 Michael Salisbury
 Graham Scott
 Anthony Taylor
 Paul Tierney

Assistant Referees

 Natalie Aspinall
 Simon Bennett
 Gary Beswick
 Lee Betts
 Stuart Burt
 Darren Cann
 Dan Cook
 Neil Davies
 Derek Eaton
 Nick Greenhalgh
 Constantine Hatzidakis
 Adrian Holmes
 Nick Hopton
 Ian Hussin
 Scott Ledger
 Harry Lennard
 Simon Long
 James Mainwaring
 Sian Massey-Ellis
 Steve Meredith
 Adam Nunn
 Marc Perry
 Dan Robathan
 Mark Scholes
 Eddie Smart
 Wade Smith 
 Richard West
 Matthew Wilkes
 Tim Wood

Video Assistant Referees (VAR)
All current Select Group 1 referees are trained as video assistant referees. Additionally, Mike Dean continues to serve as a dedicated VAR official following his on-field retirement. Lee Mason also served as a dedicated VAR official from 2021 until he left PGMOL by mutual consent in February 2023.

Assistant Video Assistant Referees (AVAR)
All Select Group 1 assistant referees are also trained as assistant video assistant referees.

FIFA International Match Officials
Among the Select Group 1 officials, 10 referees, 12 assistant referees, and 11 video assistant referees are listed on the 2023 FIFA International List.

Referees

 Stuart Attwell
 John Brooks
 Darren England
 Jarred Gillett
 Robert Jones
 Chris Kavanagh
 Andy Madley
 Michael Oliver
 Craig Pawson
 Anthony Taylor

Assistant referees

 Natalie Aspinall
 Simon Bennett
 Gary Beswick
 Lee Betts
 Stuart Burt
 Dan Cook
 Neil Davies
 Constantine Hatzidakis
 Ian Hussin
 Harry Lennard
 Sian Massey-Ellis
 Adam Nunn

Video match officials

 Stuart Attwell
 Peter Bankes
 Lee Betts
 David Coote
 Darren England
 Jarred Gillett
 Chris Kavanagh
 Andy Madley
 Sian Massey-Ellis
 Craig Pawson
 Michael Salisbury

Notable International Appointments
Some former and current Select Group 1 officials have overseen major international final matches.

Former Select Group 1 assistant referee Phil Sharp was a part of the team for the 2002 FIFA World Cup Final.

Howard Webb adjudicated the 2010 UEFA Champions League Final and subsequently the 2010 FIFA World Cup Final.  Webb was supported on both occasions by assistant referees Darren Cann and Mike Mullarkey.

Mark Clattenburg has supervised the 2012 Olympic Final, the 2016 UEFA Champions League Final, and subsequently the UEFA Euro 2016 Final.  The assistant referees that supported Clattenburg during these finals, were: Simon Beck, Steve Child, and Jake Collin.

Anthony Taylor officiated the 2021 UEFA Nations League Final.  Assistant referees Gary Beswick and Adam Nunn were also part of the team.

Michael Oliver refereed the 2022 UEFA Super Cup between Real Madrid and Eintracht Frankfurt. He was assisted by Stuart Burt and Simon Bennett

Select Group 2
In August 2022, the PGMOL announced the referees and assistant referees for the forthcoming season.

Referees

 James Bell
 Darren Bond
 John Busby 
 Andy Davies
 Matthew Donohue
 Leigh Doughty
 Geoff Eltringham
 Oli Langford
 James Linington
 Bobby Madley
 Steve Martin
 Tim Robinson
 Jeremy Simpson
 Josh Smith
 Keith Stroud
 Gavin Ward
 David Webb
 Dean Whitestone
 Andy Woolmer

Assistant Referees

 Andrew Aylott
 George Byrne
 Ian Cooper
 Adam Crysell
 Andrew Dallison 
 Philip Dermott
 Mark Dwyer
 Carl Fitch-Jackson
 Andrew Fox
 Bhups Gill
 Paul Hodskinson
 Akil Howson
 Shaun Hudson
 Jonny Hunt
 Rob Hyde
 Matt Jones
 Graham Kane
 Dan Leach
 Sam Lewis
 Geoffrey Liddle 
 Nigel Lugg
 Matt McGrath
 Rob Merchant
 Mark Pottage
 Greg Read
 Mark Russell
 Matt Smith
 Rob Smith
 Mark Stevens
 Craig Taylor
 Lee Venamore
 Adrian Waters
 Richard Wild
 James Wilson

Women's Select Group
In August 2022, the PGMOL announced the members of the Women's Select Group for the forthcoming season.

 Chloe-Ann Anderson
 Natalie Aspinall
 Georgia Ball
 Lisa Benn
 Nicoleta Bria
 Lucy-Anne Briggs
 Ella Broad
 Melissa Burgin
 Abigail Byrne
 Melissa Cairns
 Emily Carney
 Isabel Chaplin
 Phoebe Cross
 Abby Dearden
 Sophie Dennington
 Kirsty Dowle
 Ffion Eade
 Amy Fearn
 Aaron Ford
 Stacey Fullicks
 Magda Golba
 Cristiana Hattersley
 Emily Heaslip
 Lauren Impey
 Dora Jakab
 Aimee Kerr
 Sian Massey-Ellis
 Lucy May
 David Middleton
 Stacey Pearson
 Ali Rahjoo
 Lisa Rashid
 Yasmin Saeed
 Louise Saunders
 Jane Simms
 Adewunmi Soneye
 Ruby Sykes
 Jade Wardle
 Rebecca Welch
 Ceri Williams
 Paula Wyatt

Lisa Benn, Abigail Byrne, Kirsty Dowle, Stacey Pearson, and Rebecca Welch are also included as referees on the 2023 FIFA International List.

Former Select Group Officials

Referees

 Martin Atkinson
 Graham Barber
 Neale Barry
 Steve Bennett
 Mark Clattenburg
 Mike Dean
 Phil Dowd
 Steve Dunn
 Paul Durkin
 Andy D'Urso
 Roger East
 David Elleray
 Chris Foy
 Kevin Friend
 Dermot Gallagher
 Mark Halsey
 Mike Jones
 Peter Jones
 Barry Knight
 Lee Mason
 Matt Messias
 Jon Moss
 Graham Poll
 Lee Probert
 David Pugh
 Uriah Rennie
 Mike Riley
 Keith Stroud
 Rob Styles
 Neil Swarbrick
 Steve Tanner
 Peter Walton
 Howard Webb
 Alan Wiley
 Clive Wilkes
 Jeff Winter
 Eddie Wolstenholme

Assistant Referees

 Stephen Artis
 Nigel Bannister
 Simon Beck
 Charles Breakspear
 Dave Bryan
 Andrew Butler
 Mike Cairns
 Steve Child
 Jake Collin
 John Flynn
 Ron Ganfield
 Andy Garratt
 Andy Halliday
 Patrick Keane
 Peter Kirkup
 Rob Lewis
 Trevor Massey
 Mo Matadar
 Mick McDonough
 Dean Mohareb
 Mike Mullarkey
 Michael Murphy
 Andy Newbold
 Bob Pollock
 Shaun Procter-Green
 Ceri Richards
 David Richardson
 Phil Sharp
 Billy Smallwood
 John Stokes
 Gary Stott
 Paul Thompson
 Mike Tingey
 Glenn Turner
 Adam Watts
 Andy Williams
 Martin Yerby

See also

 Professional Game Match Officials Limited
 Professional Referee Organization

References

Promotion and retirement links

 
 
 
 
 
 
 
 
 
 
 
 
 
 
 

Football refereeing in England
Football organisations in England
Premier League
English Football League
FA Cup
Sports organizations established in 2001